"Can't Stop, Won't Stop" is the debut single by American hip hop duo Young Gunz, members of Philadelphia hip hop group State Property, from the 2003 album The Chain Gang Vol. 2. A remix version appeared on the Young Gunz' debut album Tough Luv featuring Chingy. It became a major hit and the highest charting State Property song to come out of the group, peaking at #14 on the U.S. Billboard Hot 100. It was nominated at the Grammys for Best Rap Performance by a Duo or Group in 2004.

Track listing
12" single
A-side
 "Can't Stop, Won't Stop" (Clean)
 "Can't Stop, Won't Stop" (Street)

B-side
 "Can't Stop, Won't Stop" (Instrumental)		
 "Can't Stop, Won't Stop" (Acapella)

Charts

Weekly charts

Year-end charts

References

2003 songs
2003 debut singles
Young Gunz songs
Roc-A-Fella Records singles
Songs written by Young Chris